The Scandinavian TPC hosted by Annika was a women's professional golf tournament on the Ladies European Tour held in Sweden. 

The tournament was played annually 1996–2008 and starting 2005 with Annika Sörenstam as the hostess. It was known as the HP Open 2003–2004 and the Compaq Open 1996–2002.

Sörenstam has won the tournament six times which is a Ladies European Tour record, after Karrie Webb's eight wins in the ANZ Ladies Masters.

Winners

External links
Ladies European Tour
Tournament official website 

Former Ladies European Tour events
Golf tournaments in Sweden
Recurring sporting events established in 1996
Recurring sporting events disestablished in 2008
1996 establishments in Sweden
2008 disestablishments in Sweden